Panagyurishte (also transliterated Panagjurište) is a town in Pazardzhik Province, Southern Bulgaria, situated in a small valley in the Sredna Gora mountains. It is 91 km east of Sofia, 43 km north of Pazardzhik. The town is the administrative centre of the homonymous Panagyurishte Municipality. Panagyurishte is an important industrial and economic center. According to the 2021 census, it has a population of 15,275 inhabitants.

Geography 
The town is located in a mountainous area. It lies in the Sredna Gora Mountains. To the north of it, near Panagyurski kolonii, is Mount Bratizha (1519 m). The Luda Yana river flows through the town, which joins with its other part after the village of Popintsi to form the Luda Yana River. The railway station is the last station on the Plovdiv-Panagyurishte railway line. Through the town passes a road, which connects Dospat (in the Rhodope Mountains) through Zlatishki Pass in the Balkan Mountains with the main road A2 - Hemus motorway (at the village of Dzhurovo, Pravets Municipality). Panagyurishte is the administrative centre of the municipality, which includes 9 other settlements. Neighbouring settlements are: the resort settlement Panagyurski kolonii (15 km to the north), the village of Oborishte (10 km to the west), the village of Banya (11 km first to the south and then to the west), the village of Bata (8 km to the south) and the town of Strelcha (12 km to the east).

History
There are dozens of Thracian mounds in the vicinity of the town. In one of them - the mound "Mramor", a burial of a Thracian chieftain was discovered. Not far from it, in 1949, the now world-famous Panagyurishte Treasure was discovered, dating back to the 4th-3rd centuries BC. It is made of pure gold and weighs 6,164 kg. Copies of the nine unique vessels are exhibited in the Historical Museum in the town, while the originals are in museums around the world and in Bulgaria.

The convenient location, the nature and the favourable climate of the area attracted people to this region in the Middle Ages. The ruins of the Bulgarian fortresses of Krasen and Dushkovchenin have been preserved.

The foundation of Panagyurishte is associated with the dramatic times after the Ottoman invasion. The name comes from "panagyur" - (from Greek: πανηγυρι, fair), as on the banks of the Luda Yana In those years there was a small fair. Later, the market moved to the place where the town of Pazardzhik is now located.

In the Middle Ages there was a settlement near the modern town, near the fortress of Krasen some 6 km south of the current location. In the course of the Bulgarian-Ottoman Wars large part the population was killed and the rest had to move to a new location. The survivors called themselves levents due to their bravery in the struggle with the invaders.

When the Turks seized the village of Asenevtsi near Sliven which guarded the road to the capital of the Bulgarian Empire Tarnovo, its population moved to Panagyurishte. Another wave of Bulgarian refugees came in the 15th century after rebellions in Macedonia (Debar, Prilep, Kostur and others). Even today the population uses language which is characteristic for both eastern and western Bulgarian dialects and the town is in the so-called Yat border. It was also known as "Otlukköy" during Ottoman rule.

At the beginning of the XIX century. Panagyurishte reached a significant economic and cultural peak. A number of crafts related to the well-developed cattle breeding developed here. Goldsmithing, which later made the town famous for the Panagyurishte School of Gold. More than 2,500 craftsmen, calfs and apprentices worked in the various trades. In the courtyard of the Historical Museum, there are reenactments of these traditional crafts. According to testimonies of American missionaries who visited the town in 1861, it had 12,500 Bulgarian inhabitants who maintained a large school.

The economic and spiritual upsurge helped the idea of national liberation to be accepted in Panagyurishte. In the autumn of 1870, Vasil Levski founded a revolutionary committee here, and the meeting was held in the house of Ivan Duhovnikov, preserved to this day in the courtyard of the Historical Museum.
Panagyurishte is primarily known for being the center of the April Uprising against the Ottoman rule in Bulgaria in 1876. On 14 April 1876, the first Bulgarian Great National Assembly was held in the historical locality of Oborishte. It was capital of the Fourth Revolutionary District which was the main center of the rebellion. The uprising was bloodily suppressed after 10 days of declared freedom, and the town was burnt down and almost completely destroyed by the Ottoman Turks. Lady Strangford arrived from Britain later that year with relief for the people of Bulgaria following the massacres that followed the April Uprising. She built a hospital at Batak and eventually other hospitals were built at Radilovo, Panagiurishte, Karlovo, Petrich and Perushtitsa.

At the end of the 19th century, the foundations of carpet weaving, a Persian type, were laid in the town. In the 20th century, the artisan nature of the work was gradually replaced by factory industry. 

In March 1923 near Panagyurishte there was a big flood after the river Luda Yana flowed and flooded the surrounding area.

After the 1950s the town experienced an economic boom. Textile industry, ore mining, high technologies in opto-mechanical and electronic instrumentation were developed. In the 1990s, the introduction of the market economy unleashed the initiative and entrepreneurship of тхе citizens. There are over 2000 registered private companies and trading companies. Education in the town is constantly developing. Cultural activity is concentrated in the Videlina Community Centre, the Memorial House Theatre and the Historical Museum, and numerous monuments.

Demographics

Population 
Panagyurishte had a fast-growing population across the years, mainly during the Communist era, where its highest peak was 22,011, recorded in 1985. After the democratic changes, the population promptly emigrated to other parts.

Religion 
The population believes in mainly Christianity, Eastern Orthodoxy being predominant, as are most of the churches. There is also one Evangelical church in the town. Muslims are not largely represented among the population, since during the Ottoman rule, the city was forbidden to them. This was due to two facts: during the time of the Janissary, the town was obliged to pay the Devshirme, which gave it the privilege of not being inhabited by Turks. Later, the Bulgarian population had to guard the passes through the Middle Forest, which gave the same privilege.

Ethnic composition

Tourism

Panagyurishte is overshadowed in tourism by nearby Koprivshtitsa, which has a much larger collection of conserved Bulgarian Revival style houses because they paid off their city to the Ottomans instead of fighting. Like Koprivshtitsa, Panagyurishte has a picturesque location in the Sredna Gora mountains, and is one of the towns associated with the historic April Uprising in 1876. The town also gained fame for the Panagyurishte golden treasure discovered there in 1949 and the Apriltsi National Memorial Complex erected in 1976 in honor of the 100th anniversary of the April Uprising. It is situated on the historic hill above the town known as Manyovo Bardo. It is also near the mineral water spas of Banya, and recreational facilities in Panagyurski kolonii.

Economy
After the Second World War Panagyurishte was transformed into a large industrial center. The Asarel Medet copper extracting and processing plant is by far the largest single employer in the municipality with over 2,500 workers and also the biggest one in the Balkans. "Opticoelectron" is an optics producing plant, mainly for military (740 workers). In the early 2000s a new similar plant, "Optix" was launched (370 workers), Micro-VIew Endoskopie Optik J.S.C. - is founded in 2002 as a private Bulgarian-German joint stock company in Panagyurishte-the company is specialized in production of optical components for endoscopic equipment with applications in medicine and technology. There are two big textile plants: "Ryton" (880 employees) and "Bultex" (680 employees). There is also a small plastics factory, "Bunai" with some 190 workers and a number of smaller enterprises.

Places of interest

The town has two big Eastern Orthodox churches, St Georgi and St Bogoroditsa, as well as several chapels. The type of architecture of Sv. Georgi with two symmetrical bell-towers can be rarely observed in the country. There are two museums: Historical Museum and Museum of Natural History. Although the town was severely destroyed by the Turks in 1876, there are several old houses which survived and have been reconstructed, including the House-Museums of Rayna Knyaginya and Marin Drinov. The Apriltsi Memorial Complex which commemorates the April Uprising dominates the sky-line of the town and can be seen from almost every neighbourhood. It was built on the top of a hill just above the central square and includes several granite compositions which encircle the main figure. It can be reached from the center by numerous stairs. There are two theatre buildings, the Old Theatre and the New Theatre. The spacious park is situated in the north-eastern part of Panagyurishte with an artificial lake, playgrounds and the Orcho Voivoda Stadium.

There are several places of interest in the vicinity of the town. The resort village Panagyurski kolonii, literally "the colony of Panagyurishte" is located at 15 km north of the town. It is very popular with the local population, as many of the citizens have summer houses there. There is a ski run and dense beech forests rich in different species of berries and mushrooms. At 6 km to the east is the famous Oborishte locality where the plan of the April uprising was discussed and accepted by delegates from all over the province. Today there is a monument there which is popular tourist attraction.

Education and healthcare

The two largest schools are the elementary "Prof. Marin Drinov" with more than 1,100 pupils and secondary "Nesho Bonchev". Other large schools include the Optical Technikal School, Mining Technical School, "20th April" elementary school, "Sv. sv. Cyril and Metodius" elementary school and others.

A large regional hospital is located in the southernmost outskirts of the town on the western banks of the Luda Yana river. There is also a large polyclinic in the center as well as numerous private doctor and dentist cabinets.

Municipality

The town is a center of the Panagyurishte municipality which includes 9 villages: Popintsi, Oborishte, Banya, Bata, Elshitsa, Levski, Panagyurski kolonii, Poibrene and Srebrinovo, as well as the town itself.

Transport
There are roads leading to the north (Panagyurski kolonii), south (Popintsi), west (Oborishte) and east (Strelcha). The road to Popintsi, and then Pazardzhik has been recently improved and expanded. The only railway leads to Strelcha and Plovdiv. Panagyurishte has bus connections to Sofia, Plovdiv and Pazardzhik, as well as nearby villages.

Panagyurishte treasure

One frosty morning on 8 December 1949 three brothers – Pavel, Petko and Michail Deikovi – worked together in the region of "Merul" tile factory near Panagyurishte. At about ten o’clock in the morning, while processing a new layer of clay, they came across unusual glossy objects. With all of its magnificence a fabulous set of vessels glittered in front of the workers. When finally unearthed, it was found to consist of a phial and eight rhytons, one shaped like an amphora and the others like heads of women or animals. Dated to the turn of the fourth and third century BC, the find was sensational, not only for its weight in gold — over 6.146 kg of pure gold, but also for the originality of its forms. It is now a world-famous Thracian treasure and one of the most valuable possessions of the National Historical Museum.

Notable people
Notable natives include historian and philologist Marin Drinov (1838–1906), writer and literary critic Nesho Bonchev (1839–1878) and revolutionary Rayna Knyaginya (1856–1917).

In 1893 the Bulgarian writer Elin Pelin was enrolled in a school in Panagyurishte.

 Atanas Shopov (1855 - 1922) - Bulgarian writer and diplomat

 Velko Koroleev (1798 - 1903) - Bulgarian educator, book publisher[12]

 Georgi Bradistilov, professor (1904 - 1977) - mathematician

 Georgi Geshanov (1872 - 1907), Bulgarian revolutionary of the All-Russian Revolutionary Army

 Georgi Kukureshkov (1867 - ?) - Bulgarian military, colonel

 Georgi Shopov (1880 - 1932) - Tolstoyist, refused military service, corresponded with Leo Tolstoy

 Damascene of Veleška (Dimitar Dipchev) (1817 - 1878) - Bulgarian clergyman, the first exarch metropolitan of Veleška

 Delcho Ilchev (1885 - 1925) - entomologist

 Delcho Lulchev (1935 - 1985) - civil engineer

 Doncho Chuparinov (1894 - 1925) - Bulgarian revolutionary, member of IMRO

 Emanuil Dzhudzhev (1835 - 1908) - Bulgarian teacher, public figure, revolutionary and clergyman

 Yoncho Berberov (1873 - 1953) - Bulgarian military man, entrepreneur

 Bishop Kyrill (Yonchev) (1920 - 2007) - Archbishop of the Orthodox Church in America's Diocese of Western Pennsylvania and Bulgarian Diocese.

 Kiril Petrov Perfanov (1890 - 1979) - documentary film director and screenwriter, actor[21]

 Kraycho Samohodov - flag bearer of Benkovski's Chetata

 Luka Ivanov (1867 - 1906) - Bulgarian soldier and revolutionary, Voivode of VOMOR

 Lachezar Dimitrov Tsotzorkov (1945 - 2017) - industrialist, patriot and philanthropist

 Marin Drinov (1838 - 1906) - Renaissance scholar and statesman, first president of the Bulgarian Literary Society (BAS)

 Nesho Bonchev (1839 - 1878) - Renaissance scholar, the first Bulgarian literary critic and pedagogue

 Nikola Belopitov (1901 - 1972) - Bulgarian engineer, inventor and businessman

 Orcho Voivoda (1829 - 1911) - centurion of the April Uprising

 Pavel Bobekov (1852 - 1877) - Chairman of the Provisional Government and a thousandaire during the April Uprising

 Pavel Deliradev (1879 - 1957) - Bulgarian revolutionary of the All-Union Revolutionary Army

 Paraskeva Dzhukelova (1970 - ) - Bulgarian drama and film actress

 Petko Koychev (1888 - 1907) - Bulgarian revolutionary, member of VMORO, who died in the Battle of Nozhot

 Petar Karapetrov (1843 - 1905) - Bulgarian revivalist, book publisher and historian

 Raina Knyaginya (1856 - 1917) - Bulgarian teacher and revolutionary

 Sava Radulov (1817 - 1887) - Bulgarian Revivalist and clergyman

 Stefan Atanasov, Bulgarian revolutionary of the All-Union Revolutionary Army, a comrade of Vasil Pachadzhiev[23]

 Stoichko Angelov (1888 - ?), Bulgarian revolutionary of the All-Russian Revolutionary Forces, a lieutenant of Nikola Dosev[24]

 Stoyu Bradistilov (1863 - 1930) - Bulgarian military leader, lieutenant general

 Stoyan Tsvetkov (1930 - 2007) - Bulgarian agronomist, breeder-geneticist, doctor of agricultural sciences

 Yanko Pavlov (1888 - 1974) - Sculptor
Damaskin Veleshki (Dimitar Ivanov Dinchev) (1817–1878) - Bulgarian churchman
Carla María de la Soledad Royo-Villanova y Urrestarazu, princess of Panagyurishte, Comité de honor de fundacionarsnova, wife of Prince Kubrat

Honour
Panagyurishte Nunatak on Greenwich Island in the South Shetland Islands, Antarctica is named after Panagyurishte.

Gallery

References

External links

 Official site of the Panagyurishte municipality
 Information about Panagyurishte
 Information about the municipality
 A guide for Panagyurishte
 Historical Museum
 Radio and television in Panagyurishte
 The Panayurishte golden treasure and its founders - the Deikovi brothers
 Town of Panagyurishte at Bulgariatravel.org - Official Tourism Portal of Bulgaria

 
Populated places in Pazardzhik Province